No Words Came Down is a Canadian short drama film, directed by Ryan Flowers and Lisa Pham and released in 2011. The film stars Andrew Gillingham as Thomas, an attractive but shy and socially awkward young man who is set up on a blind date with an older woman named Mary (Tina Hedman).

The film premiered at the 2011 Toronto International Film Festival, where it received an honorable mention from the jury for the Best Canadian Short Film award. It was subsequently screened at the 2011 Whistler Film Festival, where it won the ShortWork Award for best short film by British Columbia film students.

The film was named to TIFF's year-end Canada's Top Ten list for short films.

References

External links

2011 films
2011 short films
Canadian student films
2010s English-language films
Canadian drama short films
2010s Canadian films